Christopher Thomas Peploe (born 26 April 1981) is an English cricketer who plays for Berkshire County Cricket Club. A left-handed batsman and a slow left-arm bowler, Peploe played at first-class cricket level for Middlesex.

Born in Hammersmith, he was an MCC Young Cricketer in 2002 and played for Middlesex between 2003 and 2008. His two finest hours with the bat being when he scored 42 against Sussex in 2005 and 46 against Lancashire in 2006. In total, he scored 530 first-class runs at an average of 15.58.

However, it was his bowling that led to him playing 26 County Championship games for Middlesex as well as 17 in the various forms of limited-overs cricket and 15 in the Twenty20 Cup.

The statistics would say his best performances came in limited-overs matches, in which he took 26 wickets at an average of 22.92 and strike rate of 31.38. He twice took four-wicket hauls in this form of the game, one of which came in front of the Sky cameras against Glamorgan in 2005.

He took one wicket every 22.1 balls, which is better than in the other two forms of cricket. His 3–35 against Kent at Uxbridge deserves mentioning.

His longest run in the side came in 2006, when he played 10 County Championship matches, 3 C&G Trophy matches, 6 Twenty20 Cup matches and 5 Natwest Pro40 matches. He was mainly kept out of the side by Jamie Dalrymple, who often played ahead of Peploe when it was decided to play only one spinner. However, the signing of Murali Kartik in 2007 pushed him further down the pecking order – Peploe only played three matches that year – while Shaun Udal made it three specialist spinners in 2008.

In 2005, he played seven first-class games, gaining 18 wickets.

References

External links

1981 births
People from Hammersmith
Living people
English cricketers
Middlesex cricketers
Unicorns cricketers
Middlesex Cricket Board cricketers
Berkshire cricketers